Lujaina Mohsin Haider Darwish (born 23 June 1969) is an Omani politician. Along with Rahila Al Riyami, she was one of the first two women to be directly elected to the Consultative Assembly in 2000. In 2015 she was appointed to the Council of State. Darwish is also the chairperson of ITICS at Mohsin Haider Darwish.

Biography
Born in 1969, Darwish was the eldest of three daughters of the businessman Mohsin Haider Darwish; her sister Areej also became a businesswoman. She attended Sultan Qaboos University, where she earned a degree in English literature. She subsequently became a lecturer at the university, before joining the family business.

In 2000 she was one of fifteen female candidates in the general elections. Running in Muscat, she was one of two women elected. She was re-elected to the Assembly in 2003, but lost her seat in the 2007 elections. During her time in the Shura Council she also became president of Sidab Football Club, the second woman in the Arab world to head a football club.

She later became deputy chair of Mohsin Haider Darwish LLC, and regularly featured in lists of the most powerful Arab businesswomen published by Forbes. In 2015 she was appointed to the Council of State. She is also currently a member of the board of trustees at Al-Zahra College for Women.

References

1969 births
Living people
Sultan Qaboos University alumni
Academic staff of Sultan Qaboos University
Members of the Consultative Assembly (Oman)
Members of the Council of State (Oman)
21st-century Omani women politicians
21st-century Omani politicians